Tim, Timmy, or Timothy Ryan may refer to:

Political figures
Tim Ryan (Florida politician) (born 1956), American Democratic Party legislator and county commissioner
Tim Ryan (Ohio politician) (born 1973), American Democratic Party legislator and 2020 presidential candidate
Tim Ryan, alternative pseudonym of American Communist Party leader Eugene Dennis (1905–1961)

Sportspeople
Timmy Ryan (1910–1995), Irish hurler for Limerick
Tim Ryan (hurler) (1923–1996), Irish hurler for Tipperary
Tim Ryan (sportscaster) (born 1939), Canadian-born American sportscaster
Tim Ryan (American football, born 1967) (born 1967), American defensive tackle and broadcaster
Tim Ryan (American football, born 1968) (born 1968), American offensive lineman
Tim Ryan (footballer) (born 1974), English footballer
Tim Ryan (rugby union) (born 1984), Irish rugby player

Others
Tim Ryan (actor) (1889–1956), American performer and scenarist
Timothy Ryan (newspaper publisher), American media executive (The Baltimore Sun)
Tim Ryan (1949–2016), Canadian musician, co-founder of band Jackson Hawke
Tim Ryan (engineer), American synthesizer engineer since 1970s, founder of M-Audio
L. Timothy Ryan (born 1958), American chef and president of the Culinary Institute of America
Tim Ryan (country musician) (born 1964), American country music singer-songwriter
Tim Ryan (recovery advocate) (born 1968), American activist, drug abuse interventionist, author, and speaker
Tim Ryan (businessman), chairman of PwC.

Fictional characters
Tim Ryan (Blue Heelers), portrayed by Grant Piro in 1998–99 on Australian TV series Blue Heelers